The third season of Cougar Town, an American sitcom that airs on ABC, began airing on February 14, 2012 and concluded on May 29, 2012 with a 1-hour episode. Season three regular cast members include Courteney Cox, Christa Miller, Busy Philipps, Brian Van Holt, Dan Byrd, Ian Gomez, and Josh Hopkins. The sitcom was created by Bill Lawrence and Kevin Biegel. This is the final season to air on ABC before it moved to TBS.

Production
On January 10, 2011 ABC renewed Cougar Town for a third season, which was set to premiere sometime in midseason. In November 2011, ABC announced Cougar Town'''s third season would be cut from 22 episodes to 15. On January 17, 2012, ABC announced the series would return on Tuesday, February 14 at 8:30pm/7:30c, following Tim Allen's Last Man Standing.

The producers had been promoting the show by having the cast making cameos in other ABC shows, like Castle, Grey's Anatomy, Body of Proof, The Middle, Happy Endings, and Private Practice. On January 9, 2012 Michael Ausiello, from TV Line, reported that the season finale would focus on Jules and Grayson's wedding day.

Casting
On September 9, 2011 it was reported that Sarah Chalke, who previously worked with the show's creators in Scrubs, will have a major arc as a photography professor at Travis' college and love interest for Bobby. On October 26, 2011, it was reported that other actors from Scrubs, Zach Braff and Robert Maschio, will also guest star in the show, while Sam Lloyd and Ken Jenkins will be reprising their roles from the previous season. On December 19, 2011 it was reported that Edwin Hodge was cast as a love interest for Laurie, a military man whom Laurie dates through Skype. On January 27, 2012 it was announced that Courteney Cox's ex-husband and executive producer of the series David Arquette will guest star in the season finale as a helpful hotel concierge. This would mark the 6th collaboration between Cox and Arquette, as they both starred in the 1996 horror flick Scream and its three sequels and Arquette guest starred in the third season of Friends.

Reception
The third season of Cougar Town'' received generally favorable reviews from critics. The season currently holds an average score of 80 out of 100 on Metacritic, based on 5 reviews, indicating 'generally favorable reviews'.

Episodes

Ratings

U.S. Nielsen ratings

References

General references  
 
 

2012 American television seasons
Cougar Town seasons